WHNQ is a Southern Gospel and Contemporary Christian-formatted broadcast radio station licensed to Pennington Gap, Virginia, serving Pennington Gap and Lee County, Virginia. WHNQ is owned by Roger Bouldin, through licensee Bouldin Radio, LLC.

Translator
In addition to the main station, WHNQ is relayed by an FM translator to widen its broadcast area.

References

External links
 AM 1570 WSWV Online

Radio stations established in 1959
1959 establishments in Virginia
Contemporary Christian radio stations in the United States
Southern Gospel radio stations in the United States
HNQ